Legio VI can refer to any of the following Roman legions

 Legio VI Ferrata, which served under Julius Caesar and later Mark Antony and Augustus Caesar
 Legio VI Hispana - VI Spanish Legion, a little-known legion which might have been founded by Septimus Severus
 Legio VI Victrix, which served under Augustus Caesar
 Legio VI Herculia, levied by the emperor Diocletian

See also 
 List of Roman legions